Arcte is a genus of moths of the family Erebidae. The genus was erected by Vincenz Kollar in 1844.

Description
Palpi upturned and reaching vertex of head, and short third joint. Antennae quite simple. Thorax and abdomen clothed with long hair. Abdomen in male with a strongly ridged chitinous rasp on center of dorsum of penultimate segment, probably played on by the strong chitinous spurs of the hindlegs. Tibia fringed with long hairs.

Species
 Arcte coerula Guenée, 1852
 Arcte granulata (Guenée, 1852)
 Arcte modesta (Hoeven, 1840)
 Arcte polygrapha Kollar, [1844]
 Arcte taprobana Moore, 1885

References

 

Noctuidae
Moth genera